Starex University is a private university located in the village Binola, Gurgaon district, Haryana, India. The university was established in 2016 by the Starex group through The Haryana Private Universities (Second Amendment) Act, 2016, which was passed in August 2016, making it the 20th private university to be established through The Haryana Private Universities Act, 2006.

Campus
The campus houses separate boys and girls hostels.

Departments
The university comprises the following schools:
 School of Physical Sciences
 School of Agriculture Sciences
 School of Commerce & Management
 School of Computer Sciences & Technology
 School of Pharmaceutical Sciences

 School of Hotel Management
 School of Humanities
 School of Law

 School of Life Sciences

 School of Paramedical Sciences
 College of Pharmacy
 Phd Courses

See also 

 Education in India
 Indian Defence University
 List of institutions of higher education in Haryana

References

External links

Gurgaon district
Universities in Haryana
Educational institutions established in 2016
2016 establishments in Haryana
Private universities in India